The Canadian Military Journal is the official quarterly peer-reviewed academic journal of the Canadian Forces and the Department of National Defence. It is printed in both official languages in electronic and paper print. The editor-in-chief is David Bashow.

References

External links 
 

Military journals
Multilingual journals
Quarterly journals
Academic journals published by governments
Publications with year of establishment missing